Hristina Popović (born 26 March 1982) is a Serbian actress. She appeared in more than thirty films since 1991.

Selected filmography

References

External links 

1982 births
Living people
Actresses from Belgrade
Serbian film actresses